Barrel man, Barrel Man, or Barrelman may refer to:
Barrel man (novelty)
Barrel Man (Denver Broncos), a man who attended Denver Broncos football games clad in a barrel
Barrelman, a navigator
The Barrelman, a Newfoundland radio program
Barrelman, a type of rodeo clown
Beer Barrel Man, a former cartoon mascot of the Milwaukee Brewers, and now a costumed mascot named "Barrelman"

See also
Drunkard's cloak, punishment by being placed in a barrel
Bankruptcy barrel, wearing a barrel as symbol of penury
Diogenes of Sinope, who lived in a container sometimes translated as "barrel"